Kingsville is a town in Essex County in southwestern Ontario, Canada. It is Canada's southernmost municipality with town status. The town had a population of 21,552 in the Canada 2016 Census, up from 21,362 in the Canada 2011 Census.

History
Kingsville was incorporated as a town in 1901. On 1 January 1999, the Town was amalgamated with the adjoining Township of Gosfield North and Township of Gosfield South to form an expanded municipality.

Geography
Kingsville is west of the Municipality of Leamington, south of the Town of Lakeshore and southeast of the Town of Essex and north of Lake Erie.

The geography of Kingsville is typical of most of Essex County. The terrain is generally flat, and consists of glacial drift which is a mixture of various rocks, sand and clay. The town is approximately 570 feet above sea level.

Communities
In addition to the primary settlement at Kingsville, the municipality also includes the smaller communities of Cedar Beach, Cedar Island, Cedarhurst Park, Cottam, Klondyke, Linden Beach, North Ridge, Olinda, Ruthven and Union. The community of Albuna is located on the boundary between Kingsville and Leamington, and the communities of Arner and Elford are located on the boundary between Kingsville and Essex.

Climate

Demographics

Attractions
Kingsville is home to the Jack Miner Bird Sanctuary. Jack Miner was awarded The Order of the British Empire (OBE) for his achievements in conservation in the British Empire. It was awarded June 23, 1943, by King George VI, as King of Canada. Jack Miner is considered "the father of the conservation movement on the continent".

Kingsville is home to Colasanti's Tropical Gardens which attracts people from all over Ontario. The gardens have many varieties of tropical plants and animals.
Kingsville is also home to the Kingsville Folk Festival which is directed by Michelle Law. It began in early August 2014 and hopes to continue each year with headliners such as Bruce Cockburn.

Sports
Kingsville was, for 26 years, the home town of the Great Lakes Jr. C team Kingsville Comets. The team was sold and moved to Amherstburg in 2013, becoming the Amherstburg Admirals. The town was among the top 5 places in Canada chosen for CBC's Kraft Hockeyville 2008, and finished in 2nd place in the competition with over 1.5 million votes.

In 2015, the Kingsville Kings were formed and added to the South Conference of the Greater Metro Junior A Hockey League. They play out of the Kingsville Arena Complex.

After playing a neutral site game in Kingsville during the 2016–17 season, the St. Clair Shores Fighting Saints of the Federal Hockey League relocated to Kingsville for the 2017–18 season as the North Shore Knights. The team played most of its home games out of the Kingsville Arena Complex with a few other neutral site home games in various cities in Ontario and Quebec. After cancelling several games during the season, the Knights were not listed as an FHL member the following season.

Team Canada women's ice hockey player Meghan Agosta is from the Ruthven community in Kingsville. Agosta scored a hat trick on her birthday during the 2006 Winter Olympic games in Turin Italy.

Former major league baseball pitcher, Paul Quantrill, although born in London, Ontario, grew up in Kingsville.

Education
Kingsville has three elementary schools, Kingsville Public School, Jack Miner Public School and St. John de Brebeuf Catholic Elementary School.

A fourth school, Ruthven Public School, was closed in the summer of 2013 due to overall declining enrollment. Students from Ruthven were assigned to Jack Miner Public School.
 
Kingsville District High School has a student population of 656.

See also
List of townships in Ontario

References

External links

Populated places on Lake Erie in Canada
Towns in Ontario
Lower-tier municipalities in Ontario
Municipalities in Essex County, Ontario